The Rocky Horror Picture Show: Let's Do the Time Warp Again is the original soundtrack album to the 2016 remake of the 1975 cult classic film The Rocky Horror Picture Show. The soundtrack was released by Ode Sounds & Visuals, and produced by Grammy Award-nominated songsmith Cisco Adler. In addition to playing Columbia, Annaleigh Ashford also provided backup vocals for "Science Fiction / Double Feature", and its reprise.

Victoria Justice's cover of "Toucha, Toucha, Toucha, Touch Me" was released as a promotional single on September 15, 2016, when the album was available for pre-order on iTunes.

Track listing

Charts

References

Rocky Horror
2016 soundtrack albums
Television soundtracks